"On this Side of Goodbye" is a song written by Gerry Goffin and Carole King. It was first released by The Righteous Brothers in 1966, on a Verve Records 45 rpm single that peaked at #47 on the Billboard Hot 100 singles chart.

In 1967 Eric Burdon and the Animals released a version on the album Eric Is Here using the shorter title "This Side of Goodbye". The Animals' former keyboardist Alan Price also released a version in 1967, on his British Decca album A Price on His Head. The track also appeared in 1968 on Price's next album This Price Is Right, released in the United States by the Parrot label.

References

External links 
 Righteous Brothers' single with image of label at 45cat.com (co-writer Goffin's name is misspelt on the label)

1966 songs
1966 singles
Songs with lyrics by Gerry Goffin
Songs written by Carole King
The Animals songs